Natia Danelia (born 23 September 2003) is a Georgian footballer who plays as a midfielder for FC Nike Tbilisi and the Georgia women's national team.

Career
Danelia has been capped for the Georgia national team, appearing for the team during the UEFA Women's Euro 2021 qualifying cycle.

References

2003 births
Living people
Women's association football midfielders
Women's footballers from Georgia (country)
Georgia (country) women's international footballers